

Rhenish Franconian or Rhine Franconian is a dialect chain of West Central German. It comprises the varieties of German spoken across the western regions of the states of Saarland, Rhineland-Palatinate, northwest Baden-Württemberg, and Hesse in Germany. To the south, it is bounded by the Sankt Goar line (or  line) which separates it from Moselle Franconian; to the north, it is bounded by the Main line which is also referred to as the Speyer line which separates it from the Upper German dialects.

Subgroups

  or Hessian
 
  or Palatinate German
  or Lorraine Franconian

See also
 Saarland (section Local dialect)
 Moselle Franconian (adjacent language area)

Bibliography
 Hughes, Stephanie. 2005. Bilingualism in North-East France with specific reference to Rhenish Franconian spoken by Moselle Cross-border (or frontier) workers. In Preisler, Bent, et al., eds. The Consequences of Mobility: Linguistic and Sociocultural Contact Zones. Roskilde, Denmark: Roskilde Universitetscenter: Institut for Sprog og Kultur. .

References

Central German languages
German dialects
Rhineland
Lorraine-German people